Minette Bridget Batters (née Hill, 1967) is a British farmer who is the President of the National Farmers' Union of England and Wales for 2020–2022.

Career
Batters is a tenant farmer of a 300-acre mixed farm near Downton in Wiltshire. As well as the farm, she runs a catering business and has diversified into using a renovated barn as a wedding venue. She was a co-founder of the 2010s campaigns "Ladies in Beef" and the "Great British Beef Week".

She joined the NFU when she started farming, and rose to be county chair and a member of several NFU committees. In 2018 she became the first woman to be president of the organisation, having been vice-president from 2014 to 2018. She was re-elected in 2020 for a second two-year term as president.

In her role as vice-president and then president, Batters represents the farming community at a time of great change. She has agreed a target for the NFU of net zero greenhouse gas emissions by 2040. Leaving the European Union with its freedom of movement for farm labour, as well as the Single Market and Common Agricultural Policy will result in significant change to farming. New regulatory and transitional subsidy arrangements in the British Isles will also affect farming. Batters has supported orderly change and maintenance of high standards in UK agriculture. She had a working relationship with Michael Gove while he was secretary of state for the environment. She encourages working with the government on agriculture and trade policies so that the farming community can produce food that is globally competitive, while also improving the environment and mitigating climate change.

Honours and awards
In November 2020 she was included in the BBC Radio 4 Woman's Hour Power List 2020. In August 2021 she was appointed a Deputy Lieutenant of Wiltshire.

Personal life
Batters was brought up on a tenant farm near Salisbury and always wanted to be a farmer. She attended Godolphin School, an independent school in Salisbury. As a teenager she worked with horses for David Elsworth, including riding over 30 winners in races. Her father encouraged her to develop a career instead of becoming involved in farming, so she attended catering college and then ran a catering company. In 1998, when her father retired, she took over the farm's tenancy.

She is divorced with two children.

References

Living people
21st-century English farmers
British women farmers
People from Wiltshire
People educated at Godolphin School
1967 births
Deputy Lieutenants of Wiltshire